Ruk Pathiharn is a 2011 romance, comedy, and drama lakorn aired on Channel 3 starring  Krissada Pornweroj, Kimberly Ann Voltemas, Chalida Vijitvongthong, and Alex Rendell.

Synopsis
Nichamon Chutima (Kimberly Ann Voltemas) lost her parents and returns to Thailand to find grandparents to apologize in turn for her mother. She later find out that her grandfather had died three years ago, and so she decided to takes up her housekeeper identity Pranom Sponserb to find a way to find her grandmother.

Now a housekeeper in the Nareusorn Farm, here she discovers the feud between the two neighboring farms rooted in Chaiburathut (Krissada Pornweroj) because Thut saw a signed document between his father and the neighboring Sonalai farm owner, here he believes that the Sonalais are responsible for swindling money from his dad and this driving his father to his death.

Pimnareumon (Chalida Vijitvongthong) and Rawipaat (Alex Rendell) who is both from the opposite farms have like each other but is guarding their hearts because of the problems between their family.

Cast
Krissada Pornweroj (Smart) as Chaiburathut "Thut"
Kimberly Ann Voltemas as Nichamon "Amon" Chutima/Pranom Sponserb 
Chalida Vijitvongthong (Mint) as Pimnareumon "Mon" 
Alex Rendell as Rawipaat - Thut's younger brother and Pimnaremon's childhood friend.
Supporting Cast
Janesuda Parnto (Jane)

References

Thai television soap operas
2010s Thai television series
2011 Thai television series debuts
2012 Thai television series endings
Channel 3 (Thailand) original programming